Labinjo is a surname. Notable people with the surname include:
Alfred Labinjo (died 1885), Nigerian munitions merchant, from Imesi-ile
Joy Labinjo (born 1994), English artist of Nigerian descent
Mike Labinjo (1980–2018), Canadian gridiron football player
Murder of Arthur Labinjo-Hughes, in 2020